Major General Tod M. Bunting (born October 7, 1958) is a retired Adjutant General of Kansas; he was appointed by Governor Kathleen Sebelius and confirmed by the Kansas Senate on February 11, 2004. Bunting retired on January 8, 2011.

Military career
Major General Bunting was commissioned as a distinguished graduate of the Air National Guard Academy of Military Science in 1979 and served in a variety of positions at all levels of the Air National Guard. His experience includes serving in fighter, bomber, and air refueling units and at the National Guard State Headquarters level. Bunting has served in personnel, services, information management, as wing executive officer, as a deputy commander, and support group commander. During his career, he served in Kansas Air National Guard units including the 190th Air Refueling Group, 184th Tactical Fighter Group, 184th Bomb Wing, and in the State Headquarters of the Kansas Air National Guard. Additional assignments include duty in Colorado and Texas.

His wife, Barbara is a high school teacher.

Assignments

 November 1979 – June 1984, chief of personnel utilization, training officer, 190th Air Refueling Group, Forbes Field, Kansas
 June 1984 – September 1984, services officer, 184th Tactical Fighter Group, McConnell Air Force Base, Kansas
 September 1984 – July 1987, executive support officer, 184th Fighter Group, McConnell Air Force Base, Kansas
 July 1987 – May 1993, deputy commander for support, 184th Fighter Group, McConnell Air Force Base, Kansas
 May 1993 – November 1997, executive support staff officer, Adjutant General's Department, Kansas Air National Guard, Topeka, Kansas
 November 1997 – April 1999, Air National Guard advisor to the commander of Air Reserve Personnel Center, Denver, Colorado
 April 1999 – October 2002, Air National Guard advisor to the commander of Air Force Personnel Center, Randolph Air Force Base, Texas.
 October 2002 – January 2004, director of diversity, personnel and training, Air National Guard Readiness Center, Arlington, Virginia.
 January 2004 – February 2004, chief of staff, Headquarters, Kansas Air National Guard, Topeka, Kansas
 February 2004 – January 2011, The Adjutant General, Joint Forces Headquarters, Kansas National Guard, Topeka, Kansas

Major awards and decorations

Effective dates of promotion

References

External links
Kansas Adjutant General's Department

Living people
State cabinet secretaries of Kansas
Recipients of the Legion of Merit
United States Air Force generals
1958 births
National Guard (United States) generals